Ursin a surname. Notable people with the surname include:

Georg Frederik Ursin (1797–1849), Danish mathematician and astronomer
Holger Ursin (1934–2016), Norwegian physician and psychologist
Rupert Ursin (born 1973), Austrian quantum physicist
Nils Robert af Ursin (1854–1936), Finnish secondary school teacher and politician

See also
La Chapelle-Saint-Ursin, commune in the Cher department in the Centre region of France
Ursin Durand (1682–1771), French Benedictine of the Maurist Congregation and historian
Ursins, municipality in the district of Jura-Nord Vaudois of the canton of Vaud in Switzerland